Specula is a genus of minute sea snails, marine gastropod molluscs or micromolluscs in the family Cerithiopsidae.

Species
Species in the genus Specula include:
 
 Specula agamennonei Cecalupo & Perugia, 2019
 Specula albengai Cecalupo & Perugia, 2013
 Specula angelobaraggiai Cecalupo & Perugia, 2021
 Specula bicolor Cecalupo & Perugia, 2012
 Specula bogii Cecalupo & Perugia, 2021
 Specula boholensis Cecalupo & Perugia, 2012
 Specula campbellica (A. W. B. Powell, 1955)
 Specula churamaris Cecalupo & Perugia, 2019
 Specula copiosa Cecalupo & Perugia, 2012
 Specula dagostinoi Cecalupo & Perugia, 2017
 Specula dimatteoi Cecalupo & Perugia, 2017
 Specula dubia Cecalupo & Perugia, 2013
 Specula dumasi Cecalupo & Perugia, 2013
 Specula fragilis Cecalupo & Perugia, 2012
 Specula giamminellii Cecalupo & Perugia, 2014 
 Specula giustii Cecalupo & Perugia, 2021
 Specula guttula Cecalupo & Perugia, 2017
 Specula jumeauensis Cecalupo & Perugia, 2021
 Specula laetae Cecalupo & Perugia, 2012
 Specula mammilla (May, 1919)
 Specula menoui Cecalupo & Perugia, 2017
 Specula moalboalensis Cecalupo & Perugia, 2012
 Specula molini Cecalupo & Perugia, 2013
 Specula naoae Cecalupo & Perugia, 2019
 Specula pelorcei Cecalupo & Perugia, 2013
 Specula perplexa Cecalupo & Perugia, 2017
 Specula petitdevoizei Cecalupo & Perugia, 2013
 Specula puillandrei Cecalupo & Perugia, 2013
 Specula pulchella Cecalupo & Perugia, 2012
 Specula pusilla Cecalupo & Perugia, 2013
 Specula queenslandica Laseron, 1956
 Specula regina Cotton, 1951
 Specula retifera (Suter, 1908)
 Specula ruali Cecalupo & Perugia, 2017
 Specula santalensis Cecalupo & Perugia, 2017
 Specula seragakiensis Cecalupo & Perugia, 2019
 Specula servadeii Cecalupo & Perugia, 2017
 Specula solai Cecalupo & Perugia, 2014 
 Specula styliformis (Suter, 1908)
 Specula subcastanea Cecalupo & Perugia, 2018
 Specula turbonilloides (Tenison-Woods, 1879)
 Specula vilvilfarei Cecalupo & Perugia, 2013

Species brought into synonymy
 Specula canaliculata (Suter, 1908): synonym of Specula retifera (Suter, 1908)
 Specula dissimilis (Suter, 1908): synonym of Specula styliformis (Suter, 1908)
 † Specula infelix Marwick, 1931: synonym of † Cerithiella infelix (Marwick, 1931)  (original combination)
 Specula marginata (Suter, 1908): synonym of Mendax marginata (Suter, 1908)
 Specula odhneri (Powell, 1927) : synonym of Mendax trizonalis odhneri (Powell, 1927)
 Specula sassieri Cecalupo & Perugia, 2020: synonym of Phosinella sagraiana (d'Orbigny, 1842)
 Specula widmeriana Cecalupo & Perugia, 2014 : synonym of Sundaya widmeriana (Cecalupo & Perugia, 2014)

References

 Powell A. W. B., New Zealand Mollusca, William Collins Publishers Ltd, Auckland, New Zealand 1979

External links
 GBIF
 Finlay, H. J. (1926). A further commentary on New Zealand molluscan systematics. Transactions of the New Zealand Institute. 57: 320-485, pls 18-23

Cerithiopsidae
Taxa named by Harold John Finlay